Louis Silverman (February 28, 1909 – August 20, 1992) was a Democratic member of the Pennsylvania House of Representatives.

References

Democratic Party members of the Pennsylvania House of Representatives
1909 births
1992 deaths
20th-century American politicians